Barinya is a fossil genus from the marsupial family Dasyuridae, which contains the oldest known undoubted dasyurid.

The principal differences between Barinya and more recent dasyurids are in the dentition and skull morphology, with Barinya displaying more primitive features. One described fossil exists and at least one remains to be described. This genus has only been found at Riversleigh in Queensland, where it is quite common in deposits from the Oligo-Miocene.

References

Prehistoric dasyuromorphs
Prehistoric mammals of Australia
Miocene marsupials
Prehistoric marsupial genera
Riversleigh fauna
Fossil taxa described in 1999